Hypoxia-inducible factor 3 alpha is a protein that in humans is encoded by the HIF3A gene.

Function 

The protein encoded by this gene is the alpha-3 subunit of one of several alpha/beta-subunit heterodimeric transcription factors that regulate many adaptive responses to low oxygen tension (hypoxia). The alpha-3 subunit lacks the transactivation domain found in factors containing either the alpha-1 or alpha-2 subunits. It is thought that factors containing the alpha-3 subunit are negative regulators of hypoxia-inducible gene expression. At least three transcript variants encoding three different isoforms have been found for this gene.

In rats, it plays a negative role in the adaptation to hypoxia, because the inhibition of HIF-3α expression leads to an increase in physical endurance.

Clinical significance 

DNA methylation in the introns of HIF3A is associated with BMI an adiposity.

See also
 Hypoxia inducible factors

References

Further reading

Transcription factors
PAS-domain-containing proteins